Northkill Creek is a stream primarily located in Berks County, Pennsylvania.  It feeds into Tulpehocken Creek and covers part of the Schuylkill River and Delaware River watersheds.  Northkill Creek and its tributaries are high quality trout streams.

Geography
Northkill Creek begins in the Northkill Gap on Blue Mountain near Shartlesville. The creek flows nearly  roughly south to its confluence with Tulpehocken Creek just south of Bernville. Tributaries include Little Northkill, Mollhead and Wolf Creeks. The confluence with Little Northkill Creek is at Bernville. The Little Northkill sub-watershed drains 52.5% of this area and provides approximately 60% of the total flow.

The bedrock is primarily sandstone interbedded with shale, slate, quartzite, chert and limestone fragments.  Blue Mountain is underlain by sandstone, with quartz-rich rock.  More moderate slopes are underlain by shale.  This bedrock does not provide significant ability to neutralize acidic pollution.  The shale component limits the bedrock's water-bearing properties and hence draught resistance.

Land use
In the Northkill watershed, 61% of land is classified as agricultural and 37% as forested.  Loss of farmland to non-agricultural use is estimated at  annually.

Stream quality
That portion of Northkill Creek from its source to the I-78 bridge is designated by the Pennsylvania Department of Environmental Protection as an Exceptional Value stream.  The remainder (from I-78 to the Tulpehocken) is designated Cold Water Fishery.  The Pennsylvania Fish and Boat Commission designates Northkill Creek and its tributaries as wild trout streams.  As such Northkill Creek and its tributaries are important nurseries and refuges for wild trout.  The creek is stocked with both brown and brook trout.  The watershed has historically hosted American eel, but dams have contributed to a decline in that population.  Other significant populations include cutlips minnow, common shiner, eastern blacknose dace, creek chub, and white sucker.   Stream quality is stressed by acid rain (primarily from Ohio power plants), agricultural discharge (nitrates and phosphates), and non-agricultural development (siltation, road salt, animal waste, sewage).

History
The water and associated flora and fauna of Northkill Creek supported the Lenape and early European settlers.  Anabaptists and Lutherans settled the Northkill watershed in the early 18th century.  In 1736, several Amish families purchased land along Northkill Creek.  The Northkill Amish Settlement was the first organized Amish congregation in the U.S.
The Hochstetlers, Yoders, Hetzlers and Millers were joined by Zugs, Jotters, Glicks, Kauffmans, and Bishop Jacob Hartzler, and eventually included more than 150 residents.  They constructed stone houses, planted apple orchards, and harvested hay, wheat, and rye.  This community would later disband and move elsewhere.  In 1754, Fort Northkill was built about two miles (3 km) east of Strausstown, near the Northkill Creek and about one mile (1.6 km) south of the base of the Blue Mountain.

See also
List of rivers of Pennsylvania

References

External links
 
 Northkill Creek Water Sampling data
 Upper Northkill Creek
 Little Northkill Creek
 

Rivers of Pennsylvania
Tributaries of the Schuylkill River
Rivers of Berks County, Pennsylvania